Fleur Pauwels (born 10 March 2003) is a Belgian footballer who plays as a midfielder for Genk and the Belgium national team.

International career
Pauwels made her debut for the Belgium national team on 12 June 2021, coming on as a substitute for Aster Janssens against Luxembourg.

References

2003 births
Living people
Women's association football midfielders
Belgian women's footballers
Belgium women's international footballers
KRC Genk Ladies players
Super League Vrouwenvoetbal players
Belgium women's youth international footballers